Saha Station is a metro station of Busan Subway Line 1 located in Saha-gu, Busan, South Korea.

History 
The station was opened on June 23, 1994.

Busan Metro stations
Railway stations opened in 1994
1994 establishments in South Korea
20th-century architecture in South Korea